Katja Bennefeld was a German film actress, active in the 1930s.

Selected filmography
 Impossible Love (1932)
 Eight Girls in a Boat (1932)
 The Champion of Pontresina (1934)
 An Evening Visit (1934)
 I for You, You for Me (1934)
 The Two Seals (1934)
 Sergeant Schwenke  (1935)
 After Midnight (1938)
 You and I (1938)
 Water for Canitoga (1939)

References

Bibliography
 Giesen, Rolf. Nazi Propaganda Films: a History and Filmography. McFarland & Co., 2003.

External links

Year of birth unknown
Year of death unknown
German film actresses